William Kenneth Carpenter (April 19, 1913 – March 15, 1984) was an American discus thrower. He won the NCAA and AAU titles in 1935 and 1936, becoming the first two-time NCAA champion in a weight throw event from the University of Southern California (USC).  In 1936 Carpenter won an Olympic gold medal,  and between 1936 and 1940 held the American record in the discus.

Carpenter graduated from Compton High School, where he was a track and field star.  After attending USC, he went on to serve in the United States Navy, and then began a 33-year-long career as a coach and teacher at the College of the Sequoias and Compton Community College. In 2003 he was inducted into the USC Athletic Hall of Fame.

Carpenter appears in Leni Riefenstahl's film Olympia about the 1936 Olympic Games. He is also mentioned by Viktor Chemmel, a character in Markus Zusak's 2006 bestselling novel The Book Thief.

References

External links

1913 births
1984 deaths
American male discus throwers
United States Navy personnel of World War II
Athletes (track and field) at the 1936 Summer Olympics
Olympic gold medalists for the United States in track and field
USC Trojans men's track and field athletes
Track and field athletes from California
Compton High School alumni
University of Southern California alumni
Medalists at the 1936 Summer Olympics